The 1893–94 season was Ardwick A.F.C.'s third season of league football and second season in the Football League. In the latter half of the season, financial difficulties forced the reorganisation of the club into the team Manchester City F.C. on the day of their last league game of the season. By this name the club have been known for the rest of their history.

The season saw the unusual event of Ardwick being forced to play one game – away versus Crewe Alexandra – with only ten players. In a season in which Ardwick lost two thirds of their games and recorded one of their worst ever league results, they drew the match 1–1.

Team kit

Football League Second Division

Results summary

N.B. Points awarded for a win: 2

Reports

Cup competitions

FA Cup

Lancashire Senior Cup

Manchester Senior Cup

Friendlies

Squad statistics

Squad
Appearances for competitive matches only

Scorers

All

League

Transfers

Transfers in

Transfers out

See also
Manchester City F.C. seasons

References

External links
Extensive Manchester City statistics site

1893-94
English football clubs 1893–94 season